Class 72 was a single steam locomotive of Hekurudha Shqiptare, the railway company of Albania. The locomotive was built by Maschinenfabrik Esslingen for Dynamit Nobel initially and came to Albania later.

References

Steam locomotives of Albania
0-6-0T locomotives
Standard gauge locomotives of Albania
Railway locomotives introduced in 1941